Little Creek Methodist Church is a historic Methodist church located on Main Street in Little Creek, Kent County, Delaware. It was built in 1883, and is an ell-shaped, one-story frame building in the Late Gothic Revival style.  It has a gable roof and square bell tower topped with a tapered, pyramidal cupola housing the bell.  The bell tower has a circular, recessed, stained glass "rose" window.

It was added to the National Register of Historic Places in 1982.

References

Methodist churches in Delaware
Carpenter Gothic church buildings in Delaware
Churches completed in 1883
19th-century Methodist church buildings in the United States
Churches in Kent County, Delaware
Churches on the National Register of Historic Places in Delaware
National Register of Historic Places in Kent County, Delaware